Majidbaria Shahi Mosque is a 15th-century one-domed mosque and archaeological site located in the village of Majidbaria in Mirzaganj Upazila, part of the Patuakhali District of southern Bangladesh. It is the oldest mosque and first brick building in the Greater Barisal region having been built during the reign of Sultan Ruknuddin Barbak Shah.

History
During the reign of Sultan Ruknuddin Barbak Shah, his minister Khan-i-Azam Uzayr Khan constructed this mosque in 870 Hijri (between 1465 and 1466 CE). In 1584, a cyclone severely damaged infrastructure in the Bakla-Chandradwip region. During this period, the area was under the rule of Kandarpanarayan Rai, the Raja of Chandradwip, who also evacuated his capital in Bakla. Without fully recovering from the natural disaster, Chandradwip was then faced with Magh and Portuguese pirates. Muslim-dominant villages such as Madhabkhali, Mirzaganj, Bibichini, Talgachia, Maqamia, Karuna, Gulishahkhali, Ghuslkhali, Faqirkhali, Auliyapur and Dhulia were deserted and the area became covered in jungle, effectively becoming a part of the Sundarbans again.

In the 1860s, British Raj began plans to cultivate the Sundarbans and rediscovered the mosque, which was being inhabited by a fakir. The mosque was visited by Henry Beveridge, the District Magistrate of Barisal. In 1904, the interior of the mosque was renovated under Nicholas Beatson-Bell, the erstwhile District Magistrate of Backergunge district. The area then became known as Masjidbari or Masjidbaria by the locals, and later became corrupted to Majidbaria, though others claim that it was named after a local chairman named Majid. The mosque is now under the protection of the Department of Archaeology, though it continues to be actively used by worshippers.

Architecture
The mosque is built of limestone and terracotta bricks with attractive architectural style and craftsmanship. The mosque is 49 feet long and 35 feet wide. The main structure has 3 exquisitely carved mihrabs, three archways, 6 minars at eight corners, 4 windows in total on east-north and south sides, square main room and a verandah. Apart from this, with 75 inch thick walls, some ancient artefacts can be seen inside this mosque such as an old chest. An ancient graveyard and lake lies to the south of the mosque, which includes the tombs of Yaqin Shah and Kala Shah.

Gallery

See also
 List of archaeological sites in Bangladesh

References

Mosques in Bangladesh
Patuakhali District
Bengal Sultanate mosques
Ilyas Shahi dynasty
Mosques completed in 1465